The 1884 Missouri gubernatorial election was held on November 4, 1884 and resulted in a victory for the Democratic nominee, former Confederate general John S. Marmaduke, over the Republican candidate, former Congressman David Patterson Dyer, and Populist nominee John A. Brooks.

Marmaduke died in 1887 and was replaced for the remainder of this term by Lt. Gov. Albert P. Morehouse.

Results

References

Missouri
1884
Gubernatorial
November 1884 events